Plowmania is a monotypic genus of flowering plants belonging to the family Solanaceae. The only species is Plowmania nyctaginoides.

It is native to Mexico and Guatemala. Growing on volcanic peaks at high-elevations.
 
The genus name of Plowmania is in honour of Timothy Plowman (1944–1989), an American ethnobotanist best known for his intensive work over the course of 15 years on the genus Erythroxylum, and the cultivated coca species in particular. The Latin specific epithet of nyctaginoides means resembling Nyctago, a synonym of the genus Mirabilis. Both the genus and the species were first described and published in Kurtziana Vol.18 on page 127 in 1986.

References

Solanaceae
Monotypic Solanaceae genera
Plants described in 1986
Flora of Mexico
Flora of Guatemala